General King may refer to:

Campbell King (1871–1953), U.S. Army major general
Charles King (general) (1844–1933), U.S. Army brigadier general in the Spanish–American War
Cyrus King (1772–1817), Massachusetts Militia major general
Edward Leonard King (1873–1933), U.S. Army major general
Edward P. King (1884–1958), U.S. Army major general
Frank King (British Army officer) (1919–1998), British Army general
Henry King (British Army officer) (1776–1839), British Army lieutenant general
James C. King (born 1946), U.S. Maring Corps lieutenant general
Jeffrey R. King (fl. 1990s–2020s), U.S. Air Force major general
John F. King  (fl. 1980s–2020s), U.S. Army major general
John H. King (1820–1888), Union Army brigadier general in the American Civil War
Robert King, 1st Viscount Lorton (1773–1854), British Army general
Robert King (British Army officer) (1904–1983), British Army major  general
Rufus King (general) (1814–1876), Union Army brigadier general in the American Civil War
Wilburn Hill King (1839–1910), Confederate States Army brigadier general by assignment, but not officially appointed and confirmed
William G. King Jr. (1918–2009), U.S. Air Force brigadier general

See also
Attorney General King (disambiguation)